Sandvær Chapel is a chapel of the Church of Norway in Herøy Municipality in Nordland county, Norway. It is located in the Sandværet islands. It is an annex chapel in the Herøy parish which is part of the Nord-Helgeland prosti (deanery) in the Diocese of Sør-Hålogaland. The wooden chapel was built in a long church style in 1947. The chapel seats about 70 people.

See also
List of churches in Sør-Hålogaland

References

Herøy, Nordland
Churches in Nordland
Wooden churches in Norway
20th-century Church of Norway church buildings
Churches completed in 1947
1947 establishments in Norway
Long churches in Norway